Dry Creek is a  long 2nd order tributary to the Hyco River in Halifax County, Virginia.

Course
Dry Creek rises about 1.5 miles east-southeast of Mayo, Virginia, and then flows northwest to join the Hyco River about 3 miles southeast of Cluster Springs.

Watershed
Dry Creek drains  of area, receives about 45.8 in/year of precipitation, has a wetness index of 381.54, and is about 59% forested.

References

Rivers of Virginia
Rivers of Halifax County, Virginia
Tributaries of the Roanoke River